John Augustus Sutter (February 23, 1803 – June 18, 1880), born Johann August Sutter and known in Spanish as Don Juan Sutter, was a Swiss immigrant who became a Mexican and later an American citizen, known for establishing Sutter's Fort in the area that would eventually become Sacramento, California, the state's capital. Although he became famous following the discovery of gold by his employee James W. Marshall and the mill-making team at Sutter's Mill, Sutter saw his own business ventures fail during the California Gold Rush. Those of his elder son, John Augustus Sutter Jr., were more successful.

Early life

Johann August Sutter was born on February 23, 1803, in Kandern, Baden (present-day Germany), to Johann Jakob Sutter, a foreman at a paper mill, and Christina Wilhelmine Sutter (née Stober). His father came from the nearby town of Rünenberg, in the canton of Basel in Switzerland, and his maternal grandfather was a pastor from Grenzach, on the Swiss-German border.

After attending school in Kandern, Sutter studied at Saint-Blaise between 1818 and 1819, then worked as an apprentice at the Thurneysen printing and publishing house in Basel until 1823. Between 1823 and 1828, he worked as a clerk at clothing shops in Aarburg and Burgdorf. At age 21, he married
the daughter of a rich widow. He operated a store but showed more interest in spending money than in earning it. Because of family circumstances and mounting debts, Johann faced charges that would have him placed in jail and so he decided to dodge trial and fled to America. He styled his name as Captain John Augustus Sutter.

In May 1834, he left his wife and five children behind in Burgdorf, Switzerland, and with a French passport, he boarded the ship Sully, which travelled from Le Havre, France, to New York City, where it arrived on July 14, 1834.

The New World

In North America, John Augustus Sutter (as he would call himself for the rest of his life) undertook extensive travels. Before he went to the United States, he had learned Spanish and English in addition to Swiss French. He and 35 Germans moved from the St. Louis area to Santa Fe, New Mexico, then a province of Mexico, then moved to the town of Westport, now the site of Kansas City. On April 1, 1838, he joined a group of missionaries, led by the fur trapper Andrew Drips, and traveled the Oregon Trail to Fort Vancouver in Oregon Territory, which they reached in October. Sutter originally planned to cross the Siskiyou Mountains during the winter, but acting chief factor James Douglas convinced him that such an attempt would be perilous. Douglas charged Sutter £21 to arrange transportation on the British bark Columbia for himself and his eight followers.

The Columbia departed Fort Vancouver on November 11 and sailed to the Kingdom of Hawaii, reaching Honolulu on December 9. Sutter had missed the only ship outbound for Alta California, and had to remain in the Kingdom for four months. Over the months Sutter gained friendly relations with the Euro-American community, dining with the Consuls of the United States of America and the United Kingdom of Great Britain and Ireland, John Coffin Jones and Richard Charlton, along with merchants such as American Faxon Atherton. The brig Clementine was eventually hired by Sutter to take freight provisions and general merchandise for New Archangel (now known as Sitka), the capital of the Russian-American Company colonies in Russian America. Joining the crew as unpaid supercargo, Sutter, 10 Native Hawaiian laborers, and several other followers embarked on April 20, 1839. Staying at New Archangel for a month, Sutter joined several balls hosted by Governor Kupreyanov, who likely gave help in determining the course of the Sacramento River. The Clementine then sailed for Alta California, arriving on July 1, 1839, at Yerba Buena (now San Francisco), which at that time was only a small seaport town.

Beginnings of Sutter's Fort

At the time of Sutter's arrival, Alta California was a province of Mexico and had a population of Native Americans estimated at 100,000–700,000. Sutter had to go to the capital at Monterey to obtain permission from the governor, Juan Bautista Alvarado, to settle in the territory. Alvarado saw Sutter's plan of establishing a colony in Central Valley as useful in "buttressing the frontier which he was trying to maintain against Indians, Russians, Americans and British." Sutter persuaded Governor Alvarado to grant him 48,400 acres of land for the sake of curtailing American encroachment on the Mexican territory of California. This stretch of land was called New Helvetia and Sutter was given the right to “represent in the Establishment of New Helvetia all the laws of the country, to function as political authority and dispenser of justice, in order to prevent the robberies committed by adventurers from the United States, to stop the invasion of savage Indians, and the hunting and trading by companies from the Columbia (river).”

The governor stipulated however that for Sutter to qualify for land ownership, he had to reside in the territory for a year and become a Mexican citizen, which he did to assuage the governor on August 29, 1840. However, shortly after his land tract was granted and his fort was erected, Sutter quickly reneged on his agreement to discourage European trespass. On the contrary, Sutter aided the migration of other Europeans to California. “I gave passports to those entering the country… and this (Bautista) did not like it… I encouraged immigration, while they discouraged it. I sympathized with the Americans while they hated them.”

Construction was begun in August 1839 on a fortified settlement which Sutter named New Helvetia, or "New Switzerland," after his homeland. In order to elevate his social standing, Sutter impersonated a Swiss guard officer who had been displaced by the French Revolution and identified himself accordingly as 'Captain Sutter of the Swiss Guard'. The site is now part of the California state capital of Sacramento.

Relationship with Native Americans
Sutter's Fort had a central building made of adobe bricks, surrounded by a high wall with protection on opposite corners to guard against attack. It also had workshops and stores that produced all goods necessary for the New Helvetia settlement.

Sutter employed or enslaved Native Americans of the Miwok and Maidu tribes, the Hawaiians (Kanakas) he had brought, and also employed some Europeans at his compound. He envisioned creating an agricultural utopia, and for a time the settlement was in fact quite large and prosperous. Prior to the Gold Rush, it was the destination for most immigrants entering California via the high passes of the Sierra Nevada, including the ill-fated Donner Party of 1846, for whose rescue Sutter contributed supplies.

In order to build his fort and develop a large ranching/farming network in the area, Sutter relied on Indian labor. Some Native Americans worked voluntarily for Sutter (e.g. Nisenans, Miwoks, Ochecames), but others were subjected to varying degrees of coercion that resembled slavery or serfdom.  Sutter believed that Native Americans had to be kept "strictly under fear" in order to serve white landowners. Housing and working conditions at the fort were very poor, and have been described as "enslavement", with uncooperative Indians being "whipped, jailed, and executed." Sutter's Native American "employees" slept on bare floors in locked rooms without sanitation, and ate from troughs made from hollowed tree trunks. Housing conditions for workers living in nearby villages and rancherías was described as being more favorable.  Pierson Reading, Sutter’s fort manager, wrote in a letter to a relative that “the Indians of California make as obedient and humble slaves as the Negro in the South". If Indians refused to work for him, Sutter responded with violence. Observers accused him of using "kidnapping, food privation, and slavery" in order to force Indians to work for him, and generally stated that Sutter held the Indians under inhumane conditions. Theodor Cordua, a German immigrant who leased land from Sutter, wrote:

“When Sutter established himself in 1839 in the Sacramento Valley, new misfortune came upon these peaceful natives of the country. Their services were demanded immediately. Those who did not want to work were considered as enemies. With other tribes the field was taken against the hostile Indian. Declaration of war was not made. The villages were attacked usually before daybreak when everybody was still asleep. Neither old nor young was spared by the enemy, and often the Sacramento River was colored red by the blood of the innocent Indians, for these villages usually were situated at the banks of the rivers. During a campaign one section of the attackers fell upon the village by way of land. All the Indians of the attacked village naturally fled to find protection on the other bank of the river. But there they were awaited by the other half of the enemy and thus the unhappy people were shot and killed with rifles from both sides of the river. Seldom an Indian escaped such an attack, and those who were not murdered were captured. All children from six to fifteen years of age were usually taken by the greedy white people. The village was burned down and the few Indians who had escaped with their lives were left to their fate.”

Heinrich Lienhard, a Swiss immigrant that served as Sutter's majordomo, wrote of the treatment of the enslaved once captured: “As the room had neither beds nor straw, the inmates were forced to sleep on the bare floor. When I opened the door for them in the morning, the odor that greeted me was overwhelming, for no sanitary arrangements had been provided. What these rooms were like after ten days or two weeks can be imagined, and the fact that nocturnal confinement was not agreeable to the Indians was obvious. Large numbers deserted during the daytime, or remained outside the fort when the gates were locked.”

Lienhard also claimed that Sutter was known to rape his Indian captives, even girls as young as 12 years old. Despite the procurement of fertile agriculture, Sutter fed his Native American work force in pig troughs, where they would eat gruel with their hands in the sun on their knees. Numerous visitors to Sutter’s Fort noted the shock of this sight in their diaries, alongside their discontent for his kidnapping of Indian children who were sold into bondage to repay Sutter's debts or given as gifts. American explorer and mountain man James Clyman reported in 1846 that:

“The Capt. [Sutter] keeps 600 to 800 Indians in a complete state of Slavery and as I had the mortification of seeing them dine I may give a short description. 10 or 15 Troughs 3 or 4 feet long were brought out of the cook room and seated in the Broiling sun. All the Labourers grate [sic] and small ran to the troughs like so many pigs and fed themselves with their hands as long as the troughs contained even a moisture.”

Dr. Waseurtz af Sandels, a Swedish explorer who visited California in 1842-1843, also wrote about Sutter's brutal treatment of Indian slaves in 1842:

“I could not reconcile my feelings to see these fellows being driven, as it were, around some narrow troughs of hollow tree trunks, out of which, crouched on their haunches, they fed more like beasts than human beings, using their hands in hurried manner to convey to their mouths the thin porage [sic] which was served to them. Soon they filed off to the fields after having, I fancy, half satisfied their physical wants.”

These concerns were even shared by Juan Bautista Alvarado, then Governor of Alta California, who deplored Sutter's ill-treatment of indigenous Californians in 1845:

“The public can see how inhuman were the operations of Sutter who had no scruples about depriving Indian mothers of their children. Sutter has sent these little Indian children as gifts to people who live far from the place of their birth, without demanding of them any promises that in their homes the Indians should be treated with kindness.”

Despite his promises to the Mexican government, Sutter was hospitable to American settlers entering the region, and provided an impetus for many of them to settle there. The hundreds of thousands of acres which these men took from the Native Americans had been an important source of food and resources. As the White settlers were ranching two million head of livestock, shooting wild game in enormous numbers, and replacing wilderness with wheat fields, available food for Indians in the region diminished. In response, some Indians took to raiding the cattle of White ranchers. In August 1846, an article in The Californian declared that in respect to California Indians, "The only effectual means of stopping inroads upon the property of the country, will be to attack them in their villages." On February 28, 1847 Sutter ordered the Kern and Sutter massacres in retaliation.

Much of Sutter's labor practices were illegal under Mexican law. However, in April 22, 1850, following the annexation of California by the United States, the California state legislature passed the "Act for the Government and Protection of Indians," legalizing the kidnapping and forced servitude of Indians by White settlers.  In 1851, the civilian governor of California declared, "That a war of extermination will continue to be waged ... until the Indian race becomes extinct, must be expected." This expectation soon found its way into law. An 1851 legislative measure not only gave settlers the right to organize lynch mobs to kill Indians, but allowed them to submit their expenses to the government. By 1852 the state had authorized over a million dollars in such claims.

In 1856, a San Francisco Bulletin editorial stated, "Extermination is the quickest and cheapest remedy, and effectually prevents all other difficulties when an outbreak [of Indian violence] occurs."  In 1860 the legislature passed a law expanding the age and condition of Indians available for forced slavery. A Sacramento Daily Union article of the time accused high-pressure lobbyists interested in profiting off enslaved Indians of pushing the law through, gave examples of how wealthy individuals had abused the law to acquire Indian slaves from the reservations, and stated, "The Act authorizes as complete a system of slavery, without any of the checks and wholesome restraints of slavery, as ever was devised."

'Red Star' and 'Bear Flag' revolts

Lone star rebellion

In 1844–45, there was a revolt of the Mexican colony of California against the army of the mother country.

Two years earlier, in 1842, Mexico had removed California Governor Juan Bautista Alvarado, and sent Brigadier General Manuel Micheltorena to replace him.  It also sent an army.

The army had been recruited from Mexico’s worst jails, and the soldiers soon began stealing Californians' chickens and other property.  Micheltorena’s army was described as descending on California “like a plague of locusts, stripping the countryside bare.”  Californians complained that the army was committing robberies, beatings and rapes.

In late 1844, the Californios revolted against Micheltorena.  Micheltorena had appointed Sutter as commandante militar.  Sutter, in turn, recruited men, one of whom was John Marsh, a medical doctor and owner of the large Rancho los Meganos.  Marsh, who sided with the Californios, wanted no part of this effort.  However, Sutter gave Marsh a choice: either join the army or be arrested and put in jail.

In 1845, Sutter’s forces met the Californio forces at the Battle of Providencia (also known as the Second Battle of Cahuenga Pass).  The battle consisted primarily of an artillery exchange, and during the battle Marsh secretly went over to parley with the other side.  There was a large number of Americans fighting on both sides.  Marsh met with them and convinced the Americans on both sides that there was no reason for Americans to be fighting each other.
 
The Americans agreed and quit the fight, and as a result, Sutter’s forces lost the battle.  The defeated Micheltorena took his army back to Mexico, and Californian Pio Pico became governor.

Mexico's loss of the Mexican American War

Mexico's control of Alta California having become especially tenuous during the United States' war against Mexico, Sutter, as a self-professed citizen of France, threatened to muster British, Canadian and American immigrants and indigenous and again declare New Helvetia a republic under French protection. The first French frigate that comes here will do me justice. The first step they do against me I will make a declaration of Independence and proclaim California a Republic independent of Mexico."

On July 7, 1846, commodore (US naval captain) John B. Montgomery, in the aftermath of the renegade Bear Flag Revolt's Battle of Monterey, raised the American flag there. Montgomery sent a messenger with an American flag to Sutter, who, on July 11, 1846, hoisted the same,
completing formal transition of his fort to U.S. command the next month upon his own commission as a lieutenant under US Army Captain John C. Fremont. Command of the fort reverted to Sutter in March of the next year.

Beginning of the Gold Rush

In 1848, gold was discovered in the area. Initially, one of Sutter's most trusted employees, James W. Marshall, found gold at Sutter's Mill.  It started when Sutter hired Marshall, a New Jersey native who had served with John C. Frémont in the Bear Flag revolt, to build a water-driven sawmill in Coloma, along the American River. Sutter was intent on building a city on his property (not yet named ), including housing and a wharf on the Sacramento River, and needed lumber for the construction.  One morning, as Marshall inspected the tailrace for silt and debris, he noticed some gold nuggets and brought them to Sutter's attention. Together, they read an encyclopedia entry on gold and performed primitive tests to confirm whether it was precious metal. Sutter concluded that it was, in fact, gold, but he was very anxious that the discovery not disrupt his plans for construction and farming. At the same time, he set about gaining legitimate title to as much land near the discovery as possible.

Sutter's attempt at keeping the gold discovery quiet failed when merchant and newspaper publisher Samuel Brannan returned from Sutter's Mill to San Francisco with gold he had acquired there and began publicizing the find. Large crowds of people overran the land and destroyed nearly everything Sutter had worked for. To avoid losing everything, Sutter deeded his remaining land to his son John Augustus Sutter Jr.

When Sutter's oldest son arrived from Switzerland, Sutter Sr. asked his fellow Swiss majordomo Heinrich Lienhard to lend him his half of the gold he had mined, so that Sutter could impress his son with a large amount of the precious metal. However, when Lienhard later went to the Fort, Sutter, Jr., having taken charge of his father's debt-ridden business, was unable to return his share of the gold to Lienhard. Lienhard finally accepted Sutter's flock of sheep as payment.

The younger Sutter, who had come from Switzerland and joined his father in September 1848, saw the commercial possibilities of the land and promptly started plans for building a new town he named Sacramento, after the Sacramento River. The elder Sutter deeply resented this; he had wanted the town named Sutterville (for them) and for it to be built near New Helvetia.

Sutter gave up New Helvetia to pay the last of his debts. He rejoined his family and lived in Hock Farm (in California along the Feather River).

In 1853, the California legislature made Sutter a Major General in the California Militia.

Land grant challenge

Sutter's El Sobrante (Spanish for leftover) land grant was challenged by the Squatter's Association, and in 1858 the U.S. Supreme Court denied its validity.

Sutter got a letter of introduction to the Congress of the United States from the governor of California. He moved to Washington D.C. at the end of 1865, after Hock Farm was destroyed by fire in June 1865.

Sutter sought reimbursement of his losses associated with the Gold Rush. He received a pension of US$250 a month as a reimbursement of taxes paid on the Sobrante grant at the time Sutter considered it his own.  He and wife Annette moved to Lititz, Pennsylvania in 1871. The proximity to Washington, D.C. along with the reputed healing qualities of Lititz Springs appealed to the aging Sutter. He also wanted three of his grandchildren (he had grandchildren in Acapulco, Mexico, as well) to have the benefits of the fine private Moravian Schools. After having prospectors destroy his crops and slaughter cows leaving everything but his own gold, John Sutter spent the rest of his life trying to get the government to pay him for his losses, without success.

Sutter built his home across from the Lititz Springs Hotel (renamed in 1930 to be the General Sutter Inn and subsequently renamed to be the Lititz Springs Inn & Spa). For more than fifteen years, Sutter petitioned Congress for restitution but little was done. On June 16, 1880, Congress adjourned, once again, without action on a bill which would have given Sutter US$50,000. Two days later, on June 18, 1880, Sutter died in the Mades Hotel in Washington D.C. He was returned to Lititz and is buried adjacent to God's Acre, the Moravian Graveyard; Anna Sutter died the following January and is buried with him.

Legacy to the region

There are numerous California landmarks bearing the name of Sutter. Sutter Street in San Francisco is named for John A. Sutter. Sutter's Landing, Sutterville Road, Sutter Middle School, Sutter's Mill School, and Sutterville Elementary School in Sacramento are all named after him. The Sutterville Bend of the Sacramento River is named for Sutter, as is Sutter Health, a non-profit health care system in Northern California. The City of Sutter Creek, California and Sutter, California are also named after him. In Acapulco, Mexico, the property that used to belong to John Augustus Sutter Jr. became the Hotel Sutter, which is still in service. The Sutter Buttes, a mountain range near Yuba City, California, and Sutter County, California (of which Yuba City is the seat) are named after him as well.

The Johann Agust Sutter House in Lititz, Pennsylvania was listed on the National Register of Historic Places in 1982.

The 'Sutter's Gold' rose, an orange blend hybrid tea rose bred by Herbert C. Swim, was named after him.

Gov. Jerry Brown, elected to a third term in 2010, had a Welsh corgi named Sutter Brown, affectionately referred to as the First Dog of California.  Sutter died in late 2016 from cancer.

On June 15, 2020, amid the Black Lives Matter protests and the removal of many statues deemed to be racist, the statue of John Sutter outside the Sutter Medical Center in Sacramento, CA, was removed, "out of respect for some community members' viewpoints, and in the interest of public safety for patients and staff."

Popular culture

Scholarly studies
 Albert L. Hurtado, John Sutter: A Life on the North American Frontier (2006) University of Oklahoma Press, 416 pp. .

Films
Days of '49 (1924, serial), with Charles Brinley as Sutter
California in '49 (1924), with Charles Brinley as Sutter
The Kaiser of California (1936), with Luis Trenker as Sutter
Sutter's Gold (1936), with Edward Arnold as Sutter
Kit Carson (1940), with Edwin Maxwell as Sutter
"The Pathfinder" (The Great Adventure, 1964), with Carroll O'Connor as Sutter
 (1969), with Pierre Michael as Sutter
Donner Pass: The Road to Survival (1978), with Royal Dano as Sutter
The Chisholms, CBS miniseries, role of Sutter played by Ben Piazza (1980)
California Gold Rush (1981), with John Dehner as Sutter
Dream West (1986), with Jerry Orbach as Sutter
General Sutter (1999), with Hannes Schmidhauser as Sutter

Comics
Tex Willer Special#9: La Valle del Terrore (1996) by Claudio Nizzi and Magnus

Music
"Sutter's Mill", a song by Dan Fogelberg (1985)

Literature
, a novel by Blaise Cendrars (1925). A character sketch, it portrays his life as more tragic than it really was.
Stefan Zweig narrates Sutter's story in one of his  (1927) called  ("The Discovery of Eldorado").
Luis Trenker , 1961 novelization of his 1936 screenplay, in turn based on 
"John Sutter", a poem by Yvor Winters (1960)

See also

Kern and Sutter massacres
Fort Ross, California

References

External links
His account of the discovery of gold
Captain Sutter's account of the first discovery of the gold (illustrated lithograph)
Collection of John Sutter Journal Entries
Guide to the John Augustus Sutter Papers at The Bancroft Library
 Finding Aid to the Sutter/Link Family Papers, 1849–1992 (bulk 1849–1964), The Bancroft Library
Street names in San Francisco 
Sutterville, California State Historic Landmark
Sutter's Fort, California State Historic Landmark
General Sutter Inn  Lititz, PA
John A. Sutter Jr. Marker. Spanish (Acapulco) / English (Sacramento)

Scientific American, "Gen. John A. Sutton", 1880-07-10, pp. 21

 
California pioneers
Land owners from California
People of the California Gold Rush
1803 births
1880 deaths
American city founders
Ranchers from California
American people of the Bear Flag Revolt
Military personnel from California
German explorers of North America
Explorers of California
History of Sacramento County, California
Naturalized citizens of Mexican California
People of the Conquest of California
People from Lörrach (district)
People from Lititz, Pennsylvania
People from the Margraviate of Baden
Businesspeople from Sacramento, California
American people of Swiss-German descent
German emigrants to Mexico
Swiss emigrants to Mexico
German people of Swiss descent
German emigrants to Switzerland
People from Neuchâtel
American slave owners